is a Japanese singer and songwriter affiliated with Furutachi Project.

In 2015, she was appointed as special envoy for tourism of Kōchi Prefecture.

Discography

Studio albums 
 2013: 
 2015: 
 2016:

Singles 
 2012: 
 2014: 
 2015: 
 2015: 
 2015: 
 2016:

References

External links
  
  

1990 births
Living people
Musicians from Hiroshima
Japanese women singer-songwriters
Japanese singer-songwriters
21st-century Japanese singers
21st-century Japanese women singers